Colorimetry is "the science and technology used to quantify and describe physically the human color perception".
It is similar to spectrophotometry, but is distinguished by its interest in reducing spectra to the physical correlates of color perception, most often the CIE 1931 XYZ color space tristimulus values and related quantities.

History
The Duboscq colorimeter was invented by  Jules Duboscq in 1870.

Instruments 
Colorimetric equipment  is similar to that used in spectrophotometry. Some related equipment is also mentioned for completeness.

 A tristimulus colorimeter measures the tristimulus values of a color.
 A spectroradiometer measures the absolute spectral radiance (intensity) or irradiance of a light source.
 A spectrophotometer measures the spectral reflectance, transmittance, or relative irradiance of a color sample.
 A spectrocolorimeter is a spectrophotometer that can calculate tristimulus values.
 A densitometer measures the degree of light passing through or reflected by a subject.
 A color temperature meter measures the color temperature of an incident illuminant.

Tristimulus colorimeter 

In digital imaging, colorimeters are tristimulus devices used for color calibration. Accurate color profiles ensure consistency throughout the imaging workflow, from acquisition to output.

Spectroradiometer, spectrophotometer, spectrocolorimeter 
The absolute spectral power distribution of a light source can be measured with a spectroradiometer, which works by optically collecting the light, then passing it through a monochromator before reading it in narrow bands of wavelength.

Reflected color can be measured using a spectrophotometer (also called spectroreflectometer or reflectometer), which takes measurements in the visible region (and a little beyond) of a given color sample. If the custom of taking readings at 10 nanometer increments is followed, the visible light range of 400–700 nm will yield 31 readings. These readings are typically used to draw the sample's spectral reflectance curve (how much it reflects, as a function of wavelength)—the most accurate data that can be provided regarding its characteristics.

The readings by themselves are typically not as useful as their tristimulus values, which can be converted into chromaticity co-ordinates and manipulated through color space transformations.  For this purpose, a spectrocolorimeter may be used. A spectrocolorimeter is simply a spectrophotometer that can estimate tristimulus values by numerical integration (of the color matching functions' inner product with the illuminant's spectral power distribution). One benefit of spectrocolorimeters over tristimulus colorimeters is that they do not have optical filters, which are subject to manufacturing variance, and have a fixed spectral transmittance curve—until they age. On the other hand, tristimulus colorimeters are purpose-built, cheaper, and easier to use.

The CIE (International Commission on Illumination) recommends using measurement intervals under 5 nm, even for smooth spectra. Sparser measurements fail to accurately characterize spiky emission spectra, such as that of the red phosphor of a CRT display, depicted aside.

Color temperature meter 
Photographers and cinematographers use information provided by these meters to decide what color balancing should be done to make different light sources appear to have the same color temperature. If the user enters the reference color temperature, the meter can calculate the mired difference between the measurement and the reference, enabling the user to choose a corrective color gel or photographic filter with the closest mired factor.

Internally the meter is typically a silicon photodiode tristimulus colorimeter. The correlated color temperature can be calculated from the tristimulus values by first calculating the chromaticity co-ordinates in the CIE 1960 color space, then finding the closest point on the Planckian locus.

See also 
 Photometry
 Radiometry

References

Further reading
1. 

2. 

3. 

4. 

5. Optronik – Photometers An informative brochure with background information and specifications of their equipment.

6. Konica Minolta Sensing – Precise Color Communication – from perception to instrumentation

7. HunterLab –  A guide to measuring color and appearance of objects. The section provides information on numerical scales and indices that are used throughout the world to remove subjective measurements and assumptions.

8. NIST Publications related to colorimetry.

External links
 Colorlab MATLAB toolbox for color science computation and accurate color reproduction (by Jesus Malo and Maria Jose Luque, Universitat de Valencia). It includes CIE standard tristimulus colorimetry and transformations to a number of non-linear color appearance models (CIE Lab, CIE CAM, etc.).

Color
Physical quantities
Measurement
Radiometry